Lost Generation was the generation that came of age during World War I. Lost Generation may also refer to:

Japan
 Japanese generation that experienced the Employment Ice Age

Art, entertainment, and media

Comics
Marvel: The Lost Generation, a 12-issue limited series published by Marvel Comics

Films
The Lost Generation (1968 film), Hungarian film
Feng shui er shi nian (1983), Hong Kong-Taiwanese film by Chia Chang Liu, alternately titled in English, The Lost Generation, and titled worldwide in English, Women in Love

Literature
The Lost Generation (book), a 2006 biographical book by David Tremayne
The Lost Generation (novel series), a novel series by Hikmet Temel Akarsu

Music

Groups and labels
The Lost Generation (band), a Chicago soul group

Albums
The Lost Generation (album), a 1996 album by Shyheim
Lost Generation (1996), an album by Afrika Bambaataa
Lost Generation (album), 1975 album by Elliott Murphy

Songs
"Lost Generation" (song), a 2013 song by Rizzle Kicks

Other uses
Down to the Countryside Movement, young Chinese civilians during the Cultural Revolution moved to the countryside for agricultural work instead of education 
The "lost" generation, 1930–1970, mid-20th-century Mormons who wrote for a national audience and lost close ties to their church
The lost generation, African-American children growing up in Prince Edward County, Virginia from 1959 to 1964

See also
Generation (disambiguation)
Generation Lost, a 2006 DVD documentary by the band Rise Against
Generations Lost, a video game for the Sega Genesis
Justice League: Generation Lost, a DC Comics limited series
Lost (disambiguation) 
Stolen Generation